Valbona can refer to:

 The town of Valbona, Spain
 Valbonë, a town in northern Albania
 Valbonë (river) in Albania